{{DISPLAYTITLE:C30H50O4}}
The molecular formula C30H50O4 (molar mass: 474.71 g/mol) may refer to:

 Balsaminol A, or cucurbita-5,24-diene-3β,7β,23(R),29-tetraol
 Cucurbalsaminol A

Molecular formulas